In taxonomy, the Thermococcales are an order of microbes within the Thermococci. The species within the Thermococcales are used in laboratories as model organisms. All these species are strict anaerobes and can ferment sugars as sources of carbon, but they also need elemental sulfur.

See also
 List of Archaea genera

References

Further reading
* 
 
 
 
*

External links

Archaea taxonomic orders
Euryarchaeota